The MIL-STD-883 standard establishes uniform methods, controls, and procedures for testing microelectronic devices suitable for use within military and aerospace electronic systems including basic environmental tests to determine resistance to deleterious effects of natural elements and conditions surrounding military and space operations; mechanical and electrical tests; workmanship and training procedures; and such other controls and constraints as have been deemed necessary to ensure a uniform level of quality and reliability suitable to the intended applications of those devices. For the purpose of this standard, the term "devices" includes such items as monolithic, multichip, film and hybrid microcircuits, microcircuit arrays, and the elements from which the circuits and arrays are formed. This standard is intended to apply only to microelectronic devices.

The standard was issued by Department of Defense, US.

Environmental tests, methods 1001-1034
 1001 Barometric pressure, reduced (altitude operation)
 1002 Immersion
 1003 Insulation resistance
 1004.7 Moisture resistance
 1005.8 Steady-state life
 1006 Intermittent life
 1007 Agree life
 1008.2 Stabilization bake
 1009.8 Salt atmosphere
 1010.8 Temperature cycling
 1011.9 Thermal shock
 1012.1 Thermal characteristics
 1013 Dew point
 1014.13 Seal
 1015.10 Burn-in test
 1016.2 Life/reliability characterization tests
 1017.2 Neutron irradiation
 1018.6 Internal gas analysis
 1019.8 Ionizing radiation (total dose) test procedure
 1020.1 Dose rate induced latchup test procedure
 1021.3 Dose rate upset testing of digital microcircuits
 1022 Mosfet threshold voltage
 1023.3 Dose rate response of linear microcircuits
 1030.2 Preseal burn-in
 1031 Thin film corrosion test
 1032.1 Package induced soft error test procedure
 1033 Endurance life test
 1034.1 Die penetrant test

Mechanical tests, methods 2001-2036
 2001.2 Constant acceleration
 2002.3 Mechanical shock
 2003.7 Solderability
 2004.5 Lead integrity
 2005.2 Vibration fatigue
 2006.1 Vibration noise
 2007.2 Vibration, variable frequency
 2008.1 Visual and mechanical
 2009.9 External visual
 2010.10 Internal visual (monolithic)
 2011.7 Bond strength (bond pull test)
 2012.7 Radiography
 2013.1 Internal visual inspection for DPA
 2014 Internal visual and mechanical
 2015.11 Resistance to solvents
 2016 Physical dimensions
 2017.7 Internal visual (hybrid)
 2018.3 Scanning electron microscope (SEM) inspection of metallization
 2019.5 Die shear strength
 2020.7 Particle impact noise detection test (PIND)
 2021.3 Glassivation layer integrity
 2022.2 Wetting balance solderability
 2023.5 Nondestructive bond pull
 2024.2 Lid torque for glass-frit-sealed packages
 2025.4 Adhesion of lead finish
 2026 Random vibration
 2027.2 Substrate attach strength
 2028.4 Pin grid package destructive lead pull test
 2029 Ceramic chip carrier bond strength
 2030 Ultrasonic inspection of die attach
 2031.1 Flip chip pull-off test
 2032.1 Visual inspection of passive elements
 2035 Ultrasonic inspection of TAB bonds
 2036 Resistance to soldering heat

Electrical tests (digital), methods 3001-3024
 3001.1 Drive source, dynamic
 3002.1 Load conditions
 3003.1 Delay measurements
 3004.1 Transition time measurements
 3005.1 Power supply current
 3006.1 High level output voltage
 3007.1 Low level output voltage
 3008.1 Breakdown voltage, input or output
 3009.1 Input current, low level
 3010.1 Input current, high level
 3011.1 Output short circuit current
 3012.1 Terminal capacitance
 3013.1 Noise margin measurements for digital microelectronic devices
 3014 Functional testing
 3015.8 Electrostatic discharge sensitivity classification
 3016 Activation time verification
 3017 Microelectronics package digital signal transmission
 3018 Crosstalk measurements for digital microelectronic device packages
 3019.1 Ground and power supply impedance measurements for digital microelectronics device packages
 3020 High impedance (off-state) low-level output leakage current
 3021 High impedance (off-state) high-level output leakage current
 3022 Input clamp voltage
 3023.1 Static latch-up measurements for digital CMOS microelectronic devices
 3024 Simultaneous switching noise measurements for digital microelectronic devices

Electrical tests (linear), methods 4001-4007
 4001.1 Input offset voltage and current and bias current
 4002.1 Phase margin and slew rate measurements
 4003.1 Common mode input voltage range, Common mode rejection ratio, Supply voltage rejection ratio
 4004.2 Open loop performance
 4005.1 Output performance
 4006.1 Power gain and noise figure
 4007 Automatic gain control range

Test procedures, methods 5001-5013
 5001 Parameter mean value control
 5002.1 Parameter distribution control
 5003 Failure analysis procedures for microcircuits
 5004.11 Screening procedures
 5005.15 Qualification and quality conformance procedures
 5006 Limit testing
 5007.7 Wafer lot acceptance
 5008.9 Test procedures for hybrid and multichip microcircuits
 5009.1 Destructive physical analysis
 5010.4 Test procedures for custom monolithic microcircuits
 5011.5 Evaluation and acceptance procedures for polymeric adhesives
 5012.1 Fault coverage measurement for digital microcircuits
 5013 Wafer fabrication control and wafer acceptance procedures for processed GaAs wafers

References

External links
 MIL-STD-883 - Test method standard for microcircuits (MIL-STD-883 has no government copyrights and written with the expressed intention of being emulated and expressed exactly as-is, and as singular reference)
 MIL-PRF-19500 - Semiconductor Devices, General Specification For.
 MIL-PRF-38534 - Hybrid Microcircuits, General Specification For.
 MIL-PRF-38535 - Integrated Circuits (Microcircuits) Manufacturing, General Specification For.
 MIL-STD-1835 - Electronic Component Case Outlines.

Military of the United States standards